Paddy Coad (14 April 1920 – 8 March 1992) was an Irish football player and manager. He played as a forward for Waterford, Glenavon, Shamrock Rovers and Ireland. Although known, primarily, as a maker of goals, Coad scored 126 goals in the League of Ireland and a further 41 in the FAI Cup. In 1946–47, he was top goalscorer in the League of Ireland. As a player manager, he also guided Shamrock Rovers to three League of Ireland titles and two FAI Cups, before he returned to Waterford and guided them to their first league title in 1966. He was appointed manager of Limerick in September 1967.

Early years
Coad was educated at De La Salle school in Stephen Street in Waterford and first distinguished himself as a sportsman playing hurling and table tennis. He was even Munster champion at the latter sport. He also began to play football with Corinthians, a local junior club based in Lower Yellow Road area of Waterford. He was soon spotted by Waterford, making his League of Ireland debut in 1937 while still only 17. He then moved to Irish Football League club Glenavon but returned to Waterford after the start of the Second World War. He was a member of the Waterford team that finished as a runners up to Cork United in both the League of Ireland and the FAI Cup. Waterford could have won the league title, but their players refused to turn up for a play-off game against Cork after a dispute over bonus payments.

Shamrock Rovers
Coad signed for Shamrock Rovers in 1942 and made his debut against Brideville in the FAI Cup on 8 February. During his early seasons with the club played alongside Peter Farrell, Tommy Eglington, Jimmy McAlinden and Tommy Breen. He also helped Rovers win the FAI Cup three times. In November 1949, after the untimely death of Jimmy Dunne, Coad reluctantly accepted the position of player manager. He brought in many young players, including Liam Tuohy, and the team became known as Coad's Colts. The Colts won 19 trophies between 1954 and 1959. Under the guidance of Coad, Rovers won three League of Ireland titles and the FAI Cup twice. In 1957 they also made their debut in the European Cup. Despite losing 9–2 on aggregate to Manchester United, Coad at the age of 37, dominated the away game at Old Trafford. He made 2 appearances in the European Cup.

Waterford
Coad returned home to manage the Blues in 1960. In the 1965–66 League of Ireland season Waterford won the Championship for the first time. Coad reflected on his legacy: "To bring the first title to my native Waterford leaves everything else in the shade."

Irish international
Between 1946 and 1952, Coad also made 11 appearances and scored 3 goals for Ireland. He made his debut on 30 September 1946 in a 1–0 defeat to England. On 2 March 1947, he scored his first goal for Ireland in a 3–2 win against Spain. During this game Coad also set up both of Ireland's other goals for Davy Walsh. On 22 May 1949, he scored the only goal, a penalty, in a 1–0 win over Portugal. His third goal for Ireland came on 30 May 1951 in 3–2 away win over Norway. Ireland were 2–0 down until Peter Farrell and Alf Ringstead levelled the score. Then in the 82nd minute Coad scored from 20 yards to win the game. Coad played his last game for Ireland in a 6–0 away defeat against Spain on 1 June 1952.
Paddy's brother Seamus was also capped himself for Ireland and both Seamus' sons Gary and Nigel Coad were also capped at under age level thus continuing the family tradition Paddy started all those years previously.

He won the Texaco Hall of Fame Award in 1981 and the PFAI Merit Award in 1983.

Other information
The Shamrock Rovers Player of the Year trophy is named after Paddy Coad.

Paddy's wife, Kathleen, was the daughter of the then Rovers chairman, Joe Cunningham.

His brother, Seamus, played for Waterford in the late 1960s and managed them in the 1990s. Seamus' sons Gary Coad and Nigel Coad continued the family name by lining out for the Blues under their father before both going on to win many trophies locally. Amazingly, both Gary and Nigel became only the third set of second generation brothers to play together for Waterford, following Paddy and Seamus, the Hales and Fitzgeralds.

In 2012, Seamus' grandson, Conor, became the latest Coad to play for Waterford United.

As of 2015 Coad is twenty second in the all-time League of Ireland goalscoring list with 126 league goals.

Honours
League of Ireland Top Scorer - 1946–47

International

Sources
 The Hoops by Paul Doolan and Robert Goggins
 Gods Vs Mortals: Irish Clubs in Europe a Front Row Seat at 10 of the Greatest Games by Paul Keane

References

External links
Ireland (FAI) stats
 Paddy Coad bio
 Coad and Shamrock Rovers history
 Top goalscorer in League of Ireland 1946–47

1920 births
1992 deaths
Association footballers from County Waterford
League of Ireland players
Republic of Ireland association footballers
Republic of Ireland international footballers
Ireland (FAI) international footballers
Waterford F.C. players
Glenavon F.C. players
NIFL Premiership players
Shamrock Rovers F.C. players
Shamrock Rovers F.C. managers
Waterford F.C. managers
Limerick F.C. managers
Republic of Ireland football managers
League of Ireland managers
League of Ireland XI players
Association football forwards